The Rose of England is an album by British singer-songwriter Nick Lowe, released in 1985. It is the second overall and last album by Lowe's band the Cowboy Outfit, credited as 'Nick Lowe and His Cowboy Outfit'. It contains three cover versions; "7 Nights to Rock" (originally by Moon Mullican), "I Knew the Bride" (originally by Dave Edmunds) and "Bo Bo Skediddle" (originally by Wayne Walker).

Track listing
All songs by Nick Lowe unless otherwise noted.
 "Darlin' Angel Eyes" – 2:45
 "She Don't Love Nobody" (John Hiatt) – 3:23
 "7 Nights to Rock" (Henry Glover, Louis Innis, Buck Trail) – 2:44
 "Long Walk Back" (instrumental) (Lowe, Martin Belmont, Paul Carrack, Bobby Irwin) – 3:54
 "The Rose of England" – 3:26
 "Lucky Dog" – 3:08
 "I Knew the Bride (When She Used to Rock & Roll)" – 4:26
 "Indoor Fireworks" (Elvis Costello) – 3:28
 "(Hope to God) I'm Right" – 2:41
 "I Can Be the One You Love" – 4:02
 "Everyone" (Gary Rue, Leslie Ball) – 3:05
 "Bo Bo Skediddle" (Webb Pierce, Wayne Walker) – 3:03

Personnel

Nick Lowe – vocals, bass, guitar
Martin Belmont – guitar
Paul Carrack – organ, bass, piano, backing vocals
Bobby Irwin – drums, backing vocals

Guest musicians

Andrew Bodnar – bass on "Long Walk Back"
Nick Pentelow – tenor saxophone on "Long Walk Back"
Huey Lewis – harmonica, backing vocals on "I Knew the Bride (When She Used to Rock 'N' Roll)"
Mario Cipollina – bass on "I Knew the Bride (When She Used to Rock 'N' Roll)"
Johnny Colla – guitar, saxophone, backing vocals on "I Knew the Bride (When She Used to Rock 'N' Roll)"
Bill Gibson – drums, backing vocals on "I Knew the Bride (When She Used to Rock 'N' Roll)"
Chris Hayes – guitar, backing vocals on "I Knew the Bride (When She Used to Rock 'N' Roll)"
Sean Hopper – keyboards, backing vocals on "I Knew the Bride (When She Used to Rock 'N' Roll)"
Chris "Boothill" Thompson – banjo on "(Hope to God) I'm Right"

Charts

References

External links
 

1985 albums
Nick Lowe albums
Columbia Records albums